Johnson City is a city in Clackamas County, Oregon,  United States. The population was 566 at the 2010 census.  Because of its small area, its population density is over 8,000 per square mile, making it the most densely populated city in Oregon.

History
On June 16, 1970, the residents of a trailer court owned by Delbert Johnson voted 49-to-10 to incorporate. Johnson had started the development in 1959, and in 1968 was unsuccessful in having the area annexed to Gladstone. The 55th Oregon Legislative Assembly in 1969 established a boundary review board to prevent an increase in small incorporated cities, but proponents of Johnson City's incorporation had filed for an election before the law took effect. 

Johnson City residents are not eligible to participate in the Clackamas County library system (LINCC), and subsequently any of its county partners. They are also not eligible for North Clackamas Parks and Recreation (NCPRD) programs, which includes Meals on Wheels.

In an effort to join the Library District of Clackamas County, the Johnson City Tenant Collective (JCTC) put Measure 3-585 on the 2022 November General Election Ballot. It did not pass, and there is an open investigation against the owner of Johnson Mobile Estates for possible voter intimidation.

Geography

Demographics

2010 census
As of the census of 2010, there were 566 people, 268 households, and 141 families living in the city. The racial makeup of the city was 84.3% White, 0.4% African American, 1.4% Native American, 1.9% Asian, 7.4% from other races, and 4.6% from two or more races. Hispanic or Latino of any race were 15.4% of the population.

There were 268 households, of which 19.8% had children under the age of 18 living with them, 36.9% were married couples living together, 13.1% had a female householder with no husband present, 2.6% had a male householder with no wife present, and 47.4% were non-families. 40.3% of all households were made up of individuals, and 14.9% had someone living alone who was 65 years of age or older. The average household size was 2.09 and the average family size was 2.84.

The median age in the city was 47.1 years. 18.7% of residents were under the age of 18; 6.2% were between the ages of 18 and 24; 22.8% were from 25 to 44; 33.8% were from 45 to 64; and 18.6% were 65 years of age or older. The gender makeup of the city was 48.8% male and 51.2% female.

2000 census
As of the census of 2000, there were 634 people, 275 households, and 169 families living in the city. The population density was 11,061.5 people per square mile (4,079.8/km2). There were 286 housing units at an average density of 4,989.9 per square mile (1,840.4/km2). The racial makeup of the city was 93.69% White, 1.10% African American, 1.10% Native American, 0.47% Asian, 1.58% from other races, and 2.05% from two or more races. Hispanic or Latino of any race were 3.79% of the population.

There were 275 households, out of which 24.4% had children under the age of 18 living with them, 44.4% were married couples living together, 13.1% had a female householder with no husband present, and 38.2% were non-families. 32.4% of all households were made up of individuals, and 12.0% had someone living alone who was 65 years of age or older. The average household size was 2.28 and the average family size was 2.84.

In the city, the population was spread out, with 22.2% under the age of 18, 6.2% from 18 to 24, 30.0% from 25 to 44, 26.5% from 45 to 64, and 15.1% who were 65 years of age or older. The median age was 39 years. For every 100 females, there were 98.7 males. For every 100 females age 18 and over, there were 93.3 males.

The median income for a household in the city was $35,517, and the median income for a family was $36,985. Males had a median income of $32,500 versus $23,523 for females. The per capita income for the city was $16,967. About 6.1% of families and 8.1% of the population were below the poverty line, including 9.9% of those under age 18 and 10.7% of those age 65 or over.

Management
Johnson City is also known as Johnson Mobile Estates, a mobile home park. It has a high turnover rate, and houses are often replaced instead of resold.  Rent is increased every year, with the most recent increases at $60 a month. 

The Johnson City Tenant Collective (JCTC) was formed in 2021, when Johnson Mobile Estates tried to evict a resident for yard decorations.

See also

References

External links
 JCTC (Tenant Association) jctc.mystrikingly.com
 Johnson City (Unofficial website)
 Entry for Johnson City in the Oregon Blue Book

1959 establishments in Oregon
Cities in Clackamas County, Oregon
Cities in Oregon
Portland metropolitan area